Santiago Baños Reynaud (born 28 June 1976) is a Mexican former footballer, manager, and current Sporting President of Liga MX club América.

References

External links

1976 births
Living people
Association football defenders
Mexican footballers
Club Necaxa footballers
Atlante F.C. footballers
C.F. Monterrey players
Club Puebla players
Liga MX players
Mexican football managers
Footballers from Mexico City
Club América non-playing staff
Atlante F.C. non-playing staff